Nuclear New Build Generation Company (NNB GenCo) is a subsidiary created by EDF Energy to build and then operate two new nuclear power stations in the United Kingdom. The new plants are to be Hinkley Point C and Sizewell C and will eventually produce up to 6.4GW in total.

EDF originally entered the UK nuclear industry with the acquisition of British Energy in 2009. At the same time, EDF established NNB GenCo as a separate subsidiary for the construction of additional new nuclear plants. Centrica purchased a 20% stake in British Energy from EDF, and also had an option to acquire 20% of NNB GenCo, but on 4 February 2013, Centrica stated it would withdraw from the project.

The company's plans include building four new nuclear reactors adjacent to existing plants, two at Hinkley Point C in Somerset and two at Sizewell C in Suffolk. Framatome's (previously Areva) European Pressurized Reactor is the preferred design for the sites.

See also
Economics of new nuclear power plants
Nuclear power in the United Kingdom
Energy use and conservation in the United Kingdom

References

External links
EDF Energy new build

Energy companies established in 2009
Nuclear power companies of the United Kingdom
Électricité de France
British companies established in 2009